The Book of Zhou (Zhōu Shū) records the official history of the Xianbei-led Western Wei and Northern Zhou dynasties of China, and ranks among the official Twenty-Four Histories of imperial China. Compiled by the Tang dynasty historian Linghu Defen, the work was completed in 636 CE and consists of 50 chapters, some of which have been lost and replaced from other sources.

The book was criticised by Liu Zhiji for its attempt to glorify the ancestors of Tang dynasty officials of the time.

Sources
Compilation began with Liu Qiu 柳虯 (502-555) in the Western Wei, who was Vice-Director of the Palace Library.  Liu Qiu was assigned to compile the imperial diary in 550.  Liu Qiu was succeeded by Niu Hong 牛弘 (545-610) who also worked on the imperial diary and later became Director of the Palace Library. Niu Hong compiled an incomplete history of the Western Wei and Northern Zhou. In 629, Emperor Taizong of Tang appointed a team headed by Linghu Defen to work on compiling the Book of Zhou. The other team members were Cen Weben and Cui Renshi.

Translations
Two partial translations have been published. Dien provides a translation of volume 11 on the biography of Yuwen Hu.  
Miller provides a partial translation of volume                     50 on accounts of Western nations.

Contents

Annals (帝紀)

Biographies (列傳)

References

Footnotes

Works cited

External links
 Text of the Book of Zhou, available from National Sun Yat-sen University.
 Book of Zhou 《周書》 Chinese text with matching English vocabulary

Twenty-Four Histories
7th-century history books
Northern Zhou
History books about the Northern and Southern dynasties
Tang dynasty literature
7th-century Chinese books